The Maligne Range is a mountain range of the Canadian Rockies located directly southeast of Jasper townsite in Jasper National Park, Canada. The southern tail-end of the range finishes at Endless Chain Ridge.  

This range includes the following mountains and peaks:

References

Mountain ranges of Alberta
Ranges of the Canadian Rockies
Mountains of Jasper National Park